Robert Landale (17 December 1832 – 5 November 1903) was an Australian politician, elected as a member of the New South Wales Legislative Assembly.

Born at Lindifferon in Fife, Landale was a pastoralist who settled in the Moulamein area in 1860s with his brother Alexander. He was elected as the member for Murray in December 1864 and represented it for the rest of the parliamentary term, finishing in November 1869.

He was survived by his wife Eliza Harvey, a daughter and four sons, Robert Hunter, Cyril, Percy and Walter.

References

 

Members of the New South Wales Legislative Assembly
1832 births
1903 deaths
19th-century Australian politicians
Burials at Brookwood Cemetery